Edinburg is a village in Christian County, Illinois, United States. The population was 1,085 at the 2020 census.

Geography

Demographics

As of the 2020 census there were 1,085 people, 427 households, and 293 families residing in the village. The racial makeup of the village was 94.10% White, 0.18% African American, 0.46% Native American, 1.66% from other races, and 3.59% from two or more races. Hispanic or Latino of any race were 1.66% of the population.

There were 427 households, out of which 50.12% had children under the age of 18 living with them, 50.82% were married couples living together, 11.24% had a female householder with no husband present, and 31.38% were non-families. 23.19% of all households were made up of individuals, and 13.35% had someone living alone who was 65 years of age or older. The average household size was 2.97 and the average family size was 2.55.

The village's age distribution consisted of 21.4% under the age of 18, 3.9% from 18 to 24, 29.5% from 25 to 44, 28% from 45 to 64, and 17.3% who were 65 years of age or older. The median age was 41.2 years. For every 100 females, there were 104.1 males. For every 100 females age 18 and over, there were 102.6 males.

The median income for a household in the village was $61,042, and the median income for a family was $87,589. Males had a median income of $42,167 versus $29,896 for females. The per capita income for the village was $29,631. About 13.0% of families and 11.2% of the population were below the poverty line, including 15.1% of those under age 18 and 20.2% of those age 65 or over.

Labor Day Festivities
Since 1945 Edinburg boasts an annual Labor Day Picnic and Parade which emphasizes the rural and agricultural history of the area.  Activities including demolition derbies, tractor pulls, chili cook-offs, live music,  games,  rides, tournaments and a Labor Day Parade.

References

Villages in Christian County, Illinois
Villages in Illinois